South Atlantic Petroleum is a Nigerian oil and gas exploration and production company. It has a share in the development of the Akpo deepwater field off the coast of Port Harcourt. Its chairman is General Theophilus Danjuma.

The company is also known as "SAPETRO".

References 
 MBendi.co.za

External links

South Atlantic Petroleum

Oil and gas companies of Nigeria